Every year in the UK Singles Chart, there is a highly publicised race for the top slot on the chart immediately prior to Christmas, an honour known as the Christmas Number One. The UK public take a particular interest in chart performance and sales of singles are especially high in the two weeks before Christmas. The race for first position at Christmas has become a British institution and people will speculate, comment and bet upon the outcome.

The following is a list of UK Singles Chart Christmas number twos, songs that came in second place on the chart.

Background

The Christmas number one is a highly coveted prize in the United Kingdom, so much so that a coattail or slipstream effect occurs with all of the competing songs earning publicity, regardless of whether or not they succeed. On PRS for Music's 2010 list of the most popular Christmas songs of the year, the top three songs were all songs that had finished second on the chart: 1987's "Fairytale of New York" by The Pogues and Kirsty MacColl (beaten by the Pet Shop Boys' cover of "Always on My Mind"), 1984's "Last Christmas" by Wham! (second to Band Aid's "Do They Know It's Christmas?," which also appears on the top-10 of the PRS chart), and 1994's "All I Want for Christmas Is You", now considered a Christmas standard both in the UK and in performer Mariah Carey's native United States but one that lost the Christmas number-one to East 17's "Stay Another Day" (and would re-enter the charts in 2020, peaking second again, this time to LadBaby). In some cases, the Christmas number-one is a novelty song that has little shelf life after the Christmas season, whereas the number-two has a greater life in recurrent rotation. An example of this was 1980's "There's No One Quite Like Grandma" by St Winifred's School Choir, a song that forced "(Just Like) Starting Over" by the recently deceased John Lennon out of the number-one spot (Lennon returned to number-one the week after Christmas).

The only group to have both Christmas numbers one and two in the same year is The Beatles, a feat they achieved twice, in 1963 and 1967. George Michael, Ed Sheeran (twice) and Elton John have appeared first and second on the same chart as part of different acts—Michael with Band Aid and Wham! in 1985, Sheeran as a solo artist and as a featured artist with Eminem in 2017, and Sheeran and John as a duo and as featured artists with LadBaby in 2021. The 2021 appearance by Sheeran and John was also the only time any artist(s) have appeared first and second with different versions of essentially the same song, scoring second with "Merry Christmas" and first with its parody, "Sausage Rolls for Everyone." Cliff Richard has finished second on the Christmas charts four times, the most of any act. The highest selling Christmas number-two is "Last Christmas" by Wham! followed by "She Loves You" by The Beatles.

Another factor in the greater interest in the Christmas number two is the growing influence of reality television programmes on the chart. Popstars: The Rivals (2002) produced all of the top three singles on the Christmas UK Singles Chart. The Choir produced the number-one single in 2011 and, indirectly, 2015. The most sustained reality-orientated run at the top of the Christmas charts was The X Factor, whose winner charted number one or number two on the chart every year from the second series from 2005 to 2014. Bookmakers began to notice the X Factor trends in 2007, when, assuming the X Factor single would be a certainty for the number one, they started taking bets on who Christmas number two would be instead. The X Factor's dominance has also led to numerous novelty campaigns to attempt to prevent the show's winner from reaching the top of the chart, although only "Killing in the Name" by Rage Against the Machine was successful in 2009. Charity records have pushed the X-Factor winners down to number-two in 2011 and 2012, while in 2013 and 2014 the X-Factor winners pushed two records that would eventually sell over a million copies down to number two. The X Factor winning single plummeted dramatically in popularity beginning with the 2015 single ("Forever Young" by Louisa Johnson), the sales for which fell over 80% year-over-year. The X Factor was cancelled in 2021.

List of Christmas number two singles
Tracks marked * did top the chart either in the run-up to, or shortly after, Christmas.

See also
 List of UK Singles Chart Christmas number ones

References

UK 2
Singles Chart Christmas number twos
Singles Chart Christmas number twos